Snow White and the Seven Dwarfs is the soundtrack from the 1937 Walt Disney film, notable as the first commercially issued soundtrack album.  The recording has been expanded and reissued numerous times following its original release in January 1938 as Songs from Walt Disney's Snow White and the Seven Dwarfs (with the Same Characters and Sound Effects as in the Film of That Title).

Songs

Songs not used in the film
Songs written for the film but not used include two songs for the Dwarfs:
"Music in Your Soup"  (the accompanying sequence was completely animated, though not inked and painted, before being deleted from the film)
"You're Never Too Old to Be Young" (replaced by "The Silly Song")

Releases

Original release
The soundtrack was first issued as a collection (Victor J-8) of three 78rpm singles. Each of the singles became a Top 10 hit simultaneously in February 1938.

Track listing
Side 1: "With a Smile and a Song" b/w Side 2: "Dig-a-Dig Dig / Heigh Ho" (Victor 25735)
Side 3: "I'm Wishing / One Song" b/w Side 4: "Whistle While You Work" (Victor 25736)
Side 5: "Dwarfs' Yodel Song" b/w Side 6: "Some Day My Prince Will Come" (Victor 25737)

Current release

Track listing

"Overture" – 2:10
"Magic Mirror" – 1:25
"I'm Wishing / One Song" – 3:06
"Queen Theme" – 0:44
"Far Into the Forest" – 2:25
"Animal Friends / With a Smile and a Song" – 4:23
"Just Like a Doll's House" – 2:46
"Whistle While You Work" – 3:24
"Heigh-Ho" – 2:46
"Let's See What's Upstairs" – 1:15
"There's Trouble a-Brewin'" – 4:19
"It's a Girl" – 4:26
"Hooray! She Stays" – 2:48
"Bluddle-Uddle-Um-Dum (The Dwarfs' Washing Song)" – 4:25
"I've Been Tricked" – 4:05
"The Dwarfs' Yodel Song (The Silly Song)" – 4:35
"Some Day My Prince Will Come" – 1:53
"Pleasant Dreams" – 2:28
"A Special Sort of Death" – 2:02
"Why Grumpy, You Do Care" – 2:06
"Makin' Pies" – 3:02
"Have a Bite" – 1:26
"Chorale for Snow White" – 1:05
"Love's First Kiss (Finale)" – 4:15
"Music in Your Soup" - 2:35
"You're Never Too Old to be Young" - 3:20

Total Time: 73:36

See also

 List of Disney film soundtracks

References 

 
Disney animation soundtracks
1938 soundtrack albums
Disneyland Records soundtracks
Walt Disney Records soundtracks
Decca Records soundtracks
His Master's Voice soundtracks
Victor Talking Machine Company soundtracks
Traditional pop soundtracks